Olivier Muntenau N'Siabamfumu (born 17 March 1986) is a French footballer who plays for Norwegian second division side Kristiansund BK.

Club career
Born in Meaux, N'Siabamfumu started his professional career at Stade Rennais F.C. without playing. He then caught the eye of Italian side Ascoli. N'Siabamfumu's first season was not successful since he had a serious injury and released in summer 2008. In January he signed a trial deal to AEK Athens later a contract for six months

In 2009, he signed a two-year contract with F.C. Crotone, but just after one game played he was acquired by Carrarese.

In August 2010, he trailed for Colmar.

In March 2013, N'Siabamfumu signed for Norwegian side Kristiansund BK, after first have failed a trial with first division side Sarpsborg 08.

International career
The former member of the France national under-19 football team and participant of the 2005 UEFA European Under-19 Football Championship is currently member of the Congo DR national football team.

Personal life
His brother is the former footballer and member of RC Strasbourg Régis N'Siabamfumu.

Honours
France
2005 UEFA European Under-19 Football Championship

AEK Athens
Greek Cup: Runners up 2008–09

References

External links
 
 

1986 births
Living people
People from Meaux
Association football midfielders
French footballers
French expatriate footballers
INF Clairefontaine players
SR Colmar players
Carrarese Calcio players
Kristiansund BK players
Strømmen IF players
Stade Rennais F.C. players
Ascoli Calcio 1898 F.C. players
AEK Athens F.C. players
F.C. Crotone players
Serie A players
Serie B players
Super League Greece players
Expatriate footballers in Italy
Expatriate footballers in Greece
French sportspeople of Democratic Republic of the Congo descent
France youth international footballers
Footballers from Seine-et-Marne
Black French sportspeople